Turrisipho is a genus of sea snails, marine gastropod mollusks in the family Colidae,.

Species
Species within the genus Turrisipho include:
 Turrisipho dalli (Friele in Tryon, 1881)
 Turrisipho fenestratus (Turton, 1834)
 Turrisipho lachesis (Mørch, 1869)
 Turrisipho moebii (Dunker & Metzger, 1874)
 Turrisipho voeringi Bouchet & Warén, 1985
Synonyms
 Turrisipho undulatus (Friele in Tryon, 1881): synonym of Turrisipho lachesis (Mörch, 1869)

References

External links
 Iredale, T. (1918). Molluscan nomenclatural problems and solutions.- No. 1. Proceedings of the Malacological Society of London. 13(1-2): 28-40
 Bouchet, P. & Warén, A. (1985). Revision of the Northeast Atlantic bathyal and abyssal Neogastropoda excluding Turridae (Mollusca, Gastropoda). Bollettino Malacologico. supplement 1: 121-296
 Dall, W. H. (1918). Notes on Chrysodomus and other mollusks from the North Pacific Ocean. Proceedings of the United States National Museum. 54 (2234): 207-234

Colidae